The Duchy of Jülich comprised a state within the Holy Roman Empire from the 11th to the 18th centuries. The duchy lay west of the Rhine river and was bordered by the Electorate of Cologne to the east and the Duchy of Limburg to the west. It had territories on both sides of the river Rur, around its capital Jülich – the former Roman Iuliacum – in the lower Rhineland. The duchy amalgamated with the County of Berg beyond the Rhine in 1423, and from then on also became known as Jülich-Berg.  Later it became part of the United Duchies of Jülich-Cleves-Berg.

Its territory lies in present-day Germany (part of North Rhine-Westphalia) and in the present-day Netherlands (part of the Limburg province), its population sharing the same Limburgish dialect.

History

In the 9th century a certain Matfried was count of Jülich (pagus Juliacensis).
The first count in the gau of Jülich in Lower Lorraine, Gerhard I, was mentioned in 1003; his grandson Gerhard III began to call himself Count of Jülich in 1081. William IV, who became count in 1219, significantly enlarged the territory and in 1234 granted Jülich town privileges, provoking the Cologne Archbishop Konrad von Hochstaden, whose troops devastated the city five years later. William IV's son Walram (Count from 1278 to 1297) remained a fierce opponent of the Bishopric, supporting Duke John I of Brabant at the 1288 Battle of Worringen against Archbishop Siegfried II of Westerburg. Though Walram's younger brother Count Gerhard V had sided with German king Adolf of Nassau against his rival Albert I of Habsburg, he managed to retain his territories after Adolf of Nassau lost the Battle of Göllheim in 1298, and in 1314 supported the coronation of Louis IV of Wittelsbach at the nearby City of Aachen, once more against the will of the Cologne bishop.
The long-time conflict came to an end when Gerhard's younger son Walram became Archbishop of Cologne in 1332. His elder brother Count William V in 1336 received the title of a margrave from Emperor Louis IV, and in 1356 Emperor Charles IV of Luxembourg raised William V to the rank of duke. His son Duke William II, however, became entangled in a fierce feud with the Emperor's half-brother Wenceslaus of Luxembourg, Duke of Brabant, whom he defeated at the Battle of Baesweiler in 1371.

Thereafter Jülich's history became closely intertwined with that of its neighbours: the Duchies of Cleves and Berg as well as Guelders and the County of Mark: Duke William II had married Mary, the daughter of Duke Reginald II of Guelders, and duchess herself after the death of her half-brother Reginald III of Guelders in 1371. William II settled the conflict with the Imperial House of Luxembourg and his son William III inherited both duchies. When in 1423 however his younger brother Rainald died without heirs, the Gelderland estates chose Arnold of Egmond as duke, while Jülich amalgamated with Berg and passed to Adolf, Duke of Jülich-Berg, who belonged to a younger branch, and who had obtained Berg by virtue of the marriage of one of his ancestors.

In 1511 Duke John III of Cleves inherited Jülich and Berg through marriage with Maria of Jülich-Berg, the daughter of the last Duke, William IV. She inherited her father's estates: Jülich and Berg with the County of Ravensberg. From 1521 Jülich-Berg and Cleves formed the United Duchies of Jülich-Cleves-Berg in a personal union under Duke John III.

When the last duke of Jülich-Cleves-Berg died without direct heirs in 1609, the War of the Jülich Succession broke out. It ended with the 1614 Treaty of Xanten, which divided the separate duchies between Palatinate-Neuburg and the Margraviate of Brandenburg. Jülich and Berg fell to Count Palatine Wolfgang William of Neuburg and after the last duke of Palatinate-Neuburg (also Elector of the Palatinate from 1685) Charles III Philip had died without issue in 1742, Count Charles Theodore of Palatinate-Sulzbach (after 1777 also Duke of Bavaria) inherited Jülich and Berg.

In 1794 Revolutionary France occupied the Duchy of Jülich (Duché de Juliers), which became part of the French département of the Roer. The Treaty of Lunéville in 1801 officially acknowledged the cession of Jülich to France. In 1815, following  the defeat of Napoleon, the duchy became part of the Prussian Province of Jülich-Cleves-Berg (after 1822 part of the Prussian Rhine Province), except for the cities Sittard and Tegelen, which became part of the United Kingdom of the Netherlands.

Rulers

Counts of Jülich
 1003–1029 Gerhard I, Count in the Jülichgau
 1029–1081 Gerhard II
 1081–1128 Gerhard III, Count of Jülich
 1128–1142 Gerhard IV
 1142–1176 William I
 1176–1207 William II
 1207–1219 William III
 1219–1278 William IV
 1278–1297 Walram
 1297–1328 Gerhard V
 1328–1356 William V, margrave from 1336, duke from 1356 as William I

Dukes
— 1393–1423 in Union with Guelders, from 1423 with Berg, from 1437 with Ravensberg —

 1356–1361 William I (previously Count of Jülich)
 1362–1393 William II
 1393–1402 William III, also Duke of Guelders since 1377
 1402–1423 Reinald
 1423–1437 Adolf
 1437–1475 Gerhard
 1475–1511 William IV

House of La Marck, Dukes 
– from 1521 a part of the United Duchies of Jülich-Cleves-Berg –
 1511–1539 John
 1539–1592 William V
 1592–1609 John William I

House of Wittelsbach, Dukes 
– ''in union with Berg and Palatinate-Neuburg, after 1690 also with the Electorate of the Palatinate, from 1777 also with Bavaria–
 1614–1653 Wolfgang William
 1653–1679 Philip William
 1679–1716 John William II
 1716–1742  Charles Philip
 1742–1794 Charles Theodore

Cities 
Several cities and municipalities belonged to the Duchy of Jülich: -
JülichDürenMünstereifelEuskirchenNideggenBergheimKasterGrevenbroichMönchengladbachDahlenDülkenLinnichRanderathBrüggenSüchtelnAldenhovenHeimbachMonschau WassenbergHeinsbergGangeltGeilenkirchenWaldfeuchtSittardSusterenSinzigTegelenRemagen.

References

External links

 Edicts of Jülich, Cleves, Berg, Grand Duchy Berg, 1475–1815 (Coll. Scotti) online
Settlement of Dortmund between Brandenburg and Palatinate-Neuburg and the conflict of succession in Jülich, full text
 Map of the Duchy of Jülich in 1789
 Genealogie-Mittelalter Family of the Counts of Jülich

 
History of the Rhineland
Lower Rhenish-Westphalian Circle
States and territories disestablished in 1815
States and territories established in 1356
Former states and territories of Rhineland-Palatinate
Duchies of the Holy Roman Empire